The 2004 SEAT Cupra Championship season was the second season of the SEAT Cupra Championship in car racing. It began on 24 April at Brands Hatch, and ended on 28 August at Donington Park, after twelve rounds held in England and Scotland. The championship was won by James Pickford, after he had finished fifth in the championship's inaugural season. He held off a late-season charge from Oli Wilkinson to win the championship by just five points, with ex-British Touring Car Championship driver Tom Boardman coming in third. Pickford's prize for winning the championship was to replace Robert Huff in the SEAT Sport UK team in the BTCC for the 2005 season. Pickford finished eighth in the championship, with a best result of second, three times.

Teams and drivers
All entries ran the Mk1 SEAT León entered by SEAT themselves.

Calendar

Championship Standings
 Points were awarded as follows:

External links
 2004 season results on the SEAT Sport UK website 

SEAT Cupra Championship
SEAT Cupra Championship seasons